Meadow Island is an island situated in Nassau County, New York, off the southern shore of Long Island.

References

Islands of New York (state)
Nassau County, New York